Kylea Jane Tink (born 5 September 1970) is an Australian public relations expert, businesswoman and politician. She is a former managing director of Edelman Australia and chief executive of the McGrath Foundation. Tink was elected to the seat of North Sydney at the 2022 federal election.

Business career 

Tink is a former managing director of Edelman Australia, the largest public relations firm in the world by revenue.

She worked pro bono as a PR consultant for the McGrath Foundation, after being invited to assist the growing organisation following the death of Jane McGrath. Eventually she took up the role of CEO of the Foundation. Tink was one of the people who helped bring about the Pink Test, a cricketing fundraiser that raises awareness and money for the Foundation, including significant grants from the government. They also managed to gain partnerships beyond cricket, including a partnership with St. George Illawarra Dragons in 2013. During her time as CEO the number of Breast Care Nurses in Australia went up from 4 in 2008 to over 61 in 2011, and over 100 when she left the charity in 2014.

Tink has also been the CEO of Camp Quality. Under her leadership, the charity saw changes in their structure, including starting a Kids Impacted by a Carers Cancer (KICC) Camps, for children of parents diagnosed with cancer.

Politics

In September 2021, Tink announced her candidacy to run for the seat of North Sydney at the 2022 election. Tink won the seat in May 2022, beating the incumbent, Trent Zimmerman, 53–47 percent after preferences.

The main focus of Tink's campaign was climate policy and equality in society. On 30 August 2022 it was publicly revealed by the media that she is a shareholder of two energy companies. Viva Energy Group, which refines oil for Shell in Australia and owns Geelong Oil Refinery, and Beach Energy, an oil and gas exploration and production firm. This was brought to light after Tink published her declaration of interests, a requirement of all MP's.

Personal life 
Tink was born in the country NSW town of Coonabarabran. 

She was educated at Coonabarabran High School, and subsequently, went on to study at University of Canberra and Australian National University.

She lives in Northbridge on the North Shore of Sydney and is a mother of three.

See also
Voices groups in Australia

References

External links

 kyleatink.com.au

Living people
1970s births
21st-century Australian politicians
People from New South Wales
Independent politicians in Australia
Year of birth missing (living people)
21st-century Australian women politicians
Australian women in business
Women members of the Australian House of Representatives
Coonabarabran, New South Wales